Idiostethus is a genus of flower weevils in the beetle family Curculionidae. There are at least 20 described species in Idiostethus.

Species
These 20 species belong to the genus Idiostethus:

 Idiostethus brevipennis Casey, 1920
 Idiostethus densicollis Casey, 1920
 Idiostethus dispersus Casey, 1892
 Idiostethus ellipsoideus Casey & T.L., 1892
 Idiostethus humeralis Casey, 1920
 Idiostethus illustris Casey, 1920
 Idiostethus minutus Casey, 1920
 Idiostethus nanulus Casey, 1920
 Idiostethus ovatulus Casey, T.L., 1920
 Idiostethus ovulatus Casey, 1920
 Idiostethus parvicollis Casey, 1920
 Idiostethus proximus Casey, 1920
 Idiostethus puncticollis Casey, 1920
 Idiostethus rugicollis Casey, 1920
 Idiostethus spiniger Casey, 1920
 Idiostethus strigapunctus Ham., 1893
 Idiostethus strigosciollis Casey
 Idiostethus strigosicollis Casey, 1920
 Idiostethus subcalvus (LeConte, 1878)
 Idiostethus tubulatus (Say, 1831)

References

Further reading

 
 
 

Baridinae
Articles created by Qbugbot